Det Centrale Personregister (CPR;) is the Realm of Denmark's nationwide civil registry. Established in 1968, the registry contains the name, address, Danish personal identification number, date and place of birth, citizenship and other information on all the state's citizens and residents. Virtually every government agency in the Realm of Denmark receives information about a person from this database. The register came into force by royal assent in Greenland with the effect from 1 July 1972.

The register is housed by CPR-Kontoret (literally "The CPR Office"), which is responsible for maintaining and developing the database and communicating data to government agencies, as well as to authorised private companies.

Anyone living in Denmark including Greenland must register after 3 months (6 months if they are a citizen of a Nordic Council country). Every person registered in this database can request a free printout of his or her record.

The Danish state also runs Det Centrale Virksomhedsregister (CVR;), which is a register over Danish companies, with each company being issued a unique CVR-number.

See also
National identification number - containing examples of other CPR-like numbering

References

External links
CPR-kontoret
CPR-kontoret (English)

Government databases in Denmark
Society of Denmark